The Samsung NX 16-50mm F3.5-5.6 Power Zoom ED OIS is an interchangeable camera lens announced by Samsung on January 2, 2014.

References
http://www.dpreview.com/products/samsung/lenses/samsung_16_50_3p5-5p6_pz_ois/specifications

016-050mm F3.5-5.6 Power Zoom ED OIS
Camera lenses introduced in 2014